Masala Coffee is an Indian music band founded in 2014. The band performs across various genres - Indian folk, blues, pop and rock. Although they primarily compose original music and covers in Malayalam and Tamil, the band also performs in Hindi. Masala Coffee has also made a name for itself through the music they've composed and performed for movies including Solo, Uriyadi and Mundina Nildana.

History 

The band was founded by Varun Sunil  in 2014. The band was named "Masala Coffee" to signify the different kind of music they play (alternate folk rock).

They debuted on Kappa TV’s Music Mojo in 2014, performing their own unique versions of popular Tamil songs like “Munbe Vaa” and “Snehithane”. Videos of their performance went viral and the band soon achieved widespread fame through social media.

When the members of Masala Coffee first jammed together, it was not with the intention of forming a band. However, following the enthusiastic reception their melodious style of music received, Masala Coffee was officially formed and has never looked back. In 2019, the band decided to go ahead with two new lead singers Crishna & Aslam to explore & produce songs in Multiple languages.

The lineup as of 2020 is Varun Sunil, Crishna, Aslam, Daya Sankar, Preeth PS, David Crimson Clifton, Paul Joseph (Pauly), Amal Sivan and Steve Kottoor.

Albums 
Masala Coffee announced the release of its debut album, Kimaya, in 2018. The album is composed of ten songs in Tamil, Malayalam and Hindi, including updated versions of some of their original songs in addition to all new tracks. “Arivaal” was the first of the album’s songs to be released in November 2018, followed soon after by the Hindi track “Safar.” The band has since released a few more songs and music videos, with the rest of the album due to be released sequentially.

Masala Coffee has worked on new singles after their new line up has been made one of which is “Aadiyillalo Anthamillalo” song reminds us  we return to where we came from back to dust, perhaps we should pay attention to more things spend our moments preciously and “Manitham” song reflects on a period of survival for humankind and urges the listener to look for positives in these distressing times.

Film composing
Masala Coffee's first foray into the world of cinema was the performance of a satirical song on liquor ban for the movie Kunjiramayanam directed by Basil Joseph

The band debuted into film music direction in 2016 with the title track in a promo video for the Malayalam movie Hello Namasthe.
Its first major composing was three songs for Uriyadi, a Tamil movie directed by Vijay Kumar. Masala Coffee is also one of the composers for the movie Solo, directed by Bejoy Nambiar.

Filmography

Major events

International concerts
 Masala Coffee in Dubai on 17 October 2014 at the inaugural ceremony of KPL Dubai Season 3.
 Masala Coffee performing live for Raag 'N' Rock - The Indie Music Festival, on 11 September 2015 in Dubai
 Masala Coffee on 22 October 2016, performed at the Malaysian Independent Live Fusion Festival which will be held at the StarXpo Centre, Kuala Lumpur.
 Masala Coffee Performed for the Sarvesh Festival of Arts at the Victoria Hall, Singapore, on 25 November 2016. 
 Masala Coffee performed on 17 March 2017, at the Dubai Global Village.

References

Further reading
Manorama Online - Of fusion, folk, coffee and more
New Indian Express - Masala Coffee to soothe your musical senses
Telangana Today - Piquant concoction of music
The Hans India - Fifth edition of Hyderabad Arts Festival announced
The Hans India - Masala Coffee drops some fusion rock
Mid Day - South Indian Band Masala Coffee To Perform In Mumbai For The First Time

External links 
Masala Coffee Official Facebook Page: https://www.facebook.com/masalacoffeeband/

Indian rock music groups
Music bands from Kerala